Blood Meridian is a 1985 novel by Cormac McCarthy.

Blood Meridian may also refer to:

 Blood Meridian (band), a Canadian music group
 Blood Meridian, a 1997 album by Numb
 Blood Meridian, a 2006 EP by English band Hope of the States
 "Blood Meridian", a track from the 2011 self-titled album Heavy Metal Kings
 "Blood Meridian", a track from the 2014 album Finished People, by Sleeping Giant